Kuchen is a municipality of the district of Göppingen in Baden-Württemberg, Germany.

History
The earliest historical document ion of Kuchen, from between 1304 and 1315, refers to it as a "town" (stadt), implying that it received town rights from the Count of Helfenstein in the first half of the 13th century. Kuchen was made a market town in 1356. At some point between the years 1382 and 1396, Kuchen became a possession of the Free Imperial City of Ulm. The Fils Valley Railway was constructed through Kuchen in 1845. Kuchen was reassigned in 1938 to the newly-reorganized district of Göppingen. The town grew in every direction after World War II, and then again in the 1970s to the northeast.

Geography
The municipality (Gemeinde) of Kuchen is situated in the district of Göppingen, in Baden-Württemberg, one of the 16 States of the Federal Republic of Germany. Elevation above sea level in the municipal area ranges from a high of  Normalnull (NN) to a low of  NN.

Politics
Kuchen has one borough (Ortsteil), Kuchen, and one minor administrative area, Süddeutsche Baumwolleindustrie. There are three abandoned villages in the municipal area: Böldlinshof, Seelhofen, and Spitzenberg.

Coat of arms
Kuchen's coat of arms is divided party per fess into an upper, red half and a lower, white half. In the upper half is a white elephant standing upon a yellow, four-pointed hill, which is a reference to the House of Helfenstein. The lower half contains a red, five-petaled rose with green sepals, taken from the arms of Geislingen an der Steige, a town Kuchen has centuries of shared history with. This coat of arms first appeared in town seals created after 1930. It was approved by the Federal Ministry of the Interior and a corresponding municipal flag issued on 16 February 1959.

Transportation
Kuchen is connected to Germany's network of roadways by Bundesstraße 10 and its system of railroads by Fils Valley Railway.

References

External links

  (in German)

Towns in Baden-Württemberg
Göppingen (district)